|}

The Wayward Lad Novices' Chase is a Grade 2 National Hunt steeplechase in Great Britain which is open to horses aged four years or older. It is run at Kempton Park over a distance of about 2 miles (3,219 metres), and during its running there are twelve fences to be jumped. The race is for novice chasers, and it is scheduled to take place each year in late December during the course's Christmas Festival.

The event is named in honour of Wayward Lad, a winner of Kempton's most prestigious race, the King George VI Chase, three times during the 1980s. The earliest version of the race was contested over 2½ miles, and this was extended by 110 yards in 1992. The race was absent from the National Hunt calendar in 1999, but it returned the following year with a new distance of 2 miles. It was subsequently promoted to Grade 2 status, and it was first run at this level in 2005. From 2009 to 2015 it was sponsored by William Hill and titled the Williamhill.com Novices' Chase. From 2016 to 2018 the race was sponsored by 32Red and since 2019 Ladbrokes have been the sponsors.

Winners since 1988

See also
 Horse racing in Great Britain
 List of British National Hunt races

References
 Racing Post:

 pedigreequery.com – Wayward Lad Novices' Chase – Kempton.
 breakingnews.ie – "Frost finally beats Kempton" (2004).

National Hunt races in Great Britain
Kempton Park Racecourse
National Hunt chases